Netechma guamotea is a species of moth of the family Tortricidae. It is found in Morona-Santiago Province, Ecuador.

The wingspan is 15 mm. The ground colour of the forewings is cream, in the terminal third whiter. The suffusions, dots and strigulae (fine streaks) are dark brown. The hindwings are white cream, in the distal half mixed with brownish and with brownish reticulation (a net-like pattern).

Etymology
The species name refers to the type locality.

References

Moths described in 2009
Netechma